Fernando Fuentes (born September 24, 1966) is a Spanish sprint canoer who competed in the late 1980s. At the 1988 Summer Olympics in Seoul, he was eliminated in the semifinals of both the K-2 500 m and the K-4 1000 m events.

References
Fernando Fuentes's profile at Sports Reference.com
Biography of Fernando Fuentes 

1966 births
Living people
Canoeists at the 1988 Summer Olympics
Olympic canoeists of Spain
Spanish male canoeists
20th-century Spanish people